FCU may refer to:

Organisations
 Fission Uranium Corp. (TSX code: FCU), a Canadian mining company

Education
 Feng Chia University, in Taichung, Taiwan
 Filamer Christian University, in Roxas, Capiz, Philippines
 Fukien Christian University, now Fujian Normal University, in Fujian, China
 Fukuyama City University, in Hiroshima, Japan

Finance
 Federal credit union, in the US
 Florida Credit Union, an American financial institution
 Foreign & Colonial Eurotrust, a British investment trust
 Financial Crime Unit, Polish department of PwC

Football clubs
 FC Uijeongbu, South Korea
 FC Ultramarina, a Cape Verde
 F.C. United of Manchester, England
 FC Unterföhring, Germany
 1. FC Union Berlin, Germany

Science and technology
 Fan coil unit, in HVAC systems
 Flexor carpi ulnaris muscle, in the forearm
 Fused connection unit, in UK electrical wiring

Other uses
 Fact Checkers Unit, an American comedy series
 Ferrovia Centrale Umbra, a railway line in Italy